William Kerr (March 14, 1915 – June 21, 2005) was an American football and wrestling coach. He served as the head football coach at Fairmont State University in Fairmont, West Virginia from 1972 to 1977, compiling a record of 29–29–1.

References

1915 births
2005 deaths
Fairmont State Fighting Falcons football coaches
College wrestling coaches in the United States
High school football coaches in West Virginia
Sportspeople from Fairmont, West Virginia